Willie Clay Upshaw (born April 27, 1957 in Blanco, Texas) is a retired Major League Baseball player who played first base for the Toronto Blue Jays (1978, 1980–1987) and Cleveland Indians (1988), both of the American League.

Following his Major League career, he played two seasons in Japan for the Fukuoka Daiei Hawks (1989–1990).

He was later the field manager of the independent minor league Bridgeport Bluefish.

Biography
Upshaw was drafted by the New York Yankees in the 5th round of the 1975 Major League Baseball draft.

He was selected by the Toronto Blue Jays in the Rule 5 draft on December 5, 1977, and in 1982, became the Blue Jays' regular first-baseman, leading the team in home runs with 21, RBI with 75, and extra base hits.

In 1983 he became the first Blue Jays player to reach the 100 RBI plateau in a season, driving in 104 runs while batting .306.

Prior to the  season, Upshaw's contract was purchased by the Cleveland Indians. At the time of his retirement, he was Major League Baseball's career leader in home runs (123) and RBIs (528) for players whose surname begins with the letter U.

From 2006 to 2007 he served as the first base coach for the San Francisco Giants. When Barry Bonds broke Hank Aaron's career home run record, Upshaw was the first to congratulate him with a high-five as Bonds circled the bases.

He is the cousin of the late NFL Hall of Fame guard Gene Upshaw and former NFL defensive lineman Marvin Upshaw.

In May 2007 his son, Chad Upshaw, signed a three-year contract with the Carolina Panthers as a Tight End after going undrafted following his graduation from Buffalo.

Upshaw, who resides in Fairfield, Connecticut, spent eight seasons as manager of the independent Bridgeport Bluefish over two stints (1998-2000, 2010-2014) and also managed the club during the second half of their 2009 season following the resignation of manager Tommy John.

Upshaw was a combined 571-543 (.513) during the regular season, leading the Bluefish to four of their playoff appearances (1998-2000, 2010), three trips to the Atlantic League Championship Series (1998-1999, 2010) and their lone league championship (1999) and was named league Manager of the Year in 1998 and 2010.

References

External links

Pelota Binaria (Venezuelan Winter League)

1957 births
Living people
African-American baseball coaches
African-American baseball managers
African-American baseball players
American expatriate baseball players in Canada
American expatriate baseball players in Japan
Baseball coaches from Texas
Baseball players from Texas
Bridgeport Bluefish
Cardenales de Lara players
Venezuelan Professional Baseball League players by team
Cleveland Indians players
Fort Lauderdale Yankees players
Fukuoka Daiei Hawks players
Major League Baseball first base coaches
Major League Baseball first basemen
Minor league baseball managers
Oneonta Yankees players
People from Blanco, Texas
San Francisco Giants coaches
Syracuse Chiefs players
Toronto Blue Jays players
West Haven Yankees players
21st-century African-American people
20th-century African-American sportspeople